San Thaw Thaw (born 9 January 2001) is a Burmese footballer who plays as a forward for the Myanmar women's national team.

International career
San Thaw Thaw represented Myanmar at the 2015 AFC U-14 Girls' Regional Championship, the 2017 AFC U-16 Women's Championship and the 2019 AFC U-19 Women's Championship. She made her senior debut on 20 November 2019 in a 1–0 friendly win against Chinese Taipei. She played the 2019 Southeast Asian Games.

International goals

References

2001 births
Living people
Women's association football forwards
Burmese women's footballers
People from Ayeyarwady Region
Myanmar women's international footballers
Southeast Asian Games bronze medalists for Myanmar
Southeast Asian Games medalists in football
Competitors at the 2019 Southeast Asian Games